Fred Leech (5 December 1923 – December 2001) was an English professional footballer who played as a centre forward.

Career
Born in Stalybridge, Leech played for Hurst and Bradford City. During his time with Bradford City he made seven appearances in the Football League, scoring two goals.

He also played for Range Boilers and Manchester City. He signed for Mossley from Goslings, playing six games and scoring twice in 1946–47 season before going on to play for Stockport County, Accrington Stanley, Crewe Alexandra and Hyde United.

Sources

References

1923 births
2001 deaths
English footballers
Ashton United F.C. players
Bradford City A.F.C. players
English Football League players
Association football forwards
Mossley A.F.C. players
Stockport County F.C. players
Accrington Stanley F.C. (1891) players
Crewe Alexandra F.C. players
Hyde United F.C. players
Manchester City F.C. players